Sir Robert Richmond Rex  (25 January 190912 December 1992) was the first Premier of the Pacific island state of Niue.

Early life and family
Rex was born to parents Leslie Lucas Richmond Rex, a European trader on Niue, and Fisimonomono Tufaina of Avatele Village in the south of Niue. He later settled down in Alofi, the capital of Niue, with his wife of that village, Patricia Rex,  (1918–2004).

Rex was the great uncle of the rugby player Frank Bunce.

Political career
Rex was Premier of Niue from its establishment as a self-governing territory on 19 October 1974 until his death in 1992. Upon his death in office, he was succeeded by Mititaiagimene Young Vivian, until General Elections the following year resulted in the election of Frank Fakaotimanava Lui into office. Having served 18 years in office, he is Niue's longest serving Premier.

Although Rex was opposed to party politics on Niue, he was supported by the Niue People's Action Party after its formation in 1987. During his almost two decades in office, Rex held virtually all Government ministerial portfolios from time to time. His Cabinet of Ministers included prominent Niuean figures such as Dr Enetama Lipitoa, Mititaiagimene Young Vivian and Frank Fakaotimanava Lui, the latter two also going on to become Premiers of Niue.

Honours
In the 1973 New Year Honours, Rex was made an Officer of the Order of the British Empire, for valuable services to the people of Niue.  He was appointed a Companion of the Order of St Michael and St George in the 1977 Queen's Silver Jubilee and Birthday Honours.

Rex was the first Niuean to receive a knighthood, being appointed a Knight Commander of the Order of the British Empire in the 1984 New Year Honours.

References

1909 births
1992 deaths
Premiers of Niue
Members of the Niue Assembly
Niue People's Party politicians
New Zealand Knights Commander of the Order of the British Empire
Companions of the Order of St Michael and St George
Niuean knights
20th-century New Zealand politicians